Hemiaclis incolorata is a species of sea snail, a marine gastropod mollusk in the family Eulimidae.

Description 
The maximum recorded shell length is 6.5 mm.

Habitat 
Minimum recorded depth is 300 m. Maximum recorded depth is 1437 m.

References

External links

Eulimidae
Gastropods described in 1912